Griesheim is a quarter of Frankfurt am Main, Germany. It is part of the Ortsbezirk West.

Griesheim had been an independent town until 1928, the year of its suburbanisation. It is located between Nied, Sossenheim, Bockenheim, Gallus and Schwanheim.

References

External links
 Geschichtsverein Griesheim
 „Griesheim, Gemeinde Frankfurt am Main“, in: Historisches Ortslexikon

Districts of Frankfurt